Coptotriche subnubila is a moth of the family Tischeriidae. It was described by Annette Frances Braun in 1972. It is found in the US states of Arizona and New Mexico.

The larvae feed on Quercus grisea. They mine the leaves of their host plant.

References

Moths described in 1972
Tischeriidae